Frank Jude Scelfo (born February 9, 1959) is an American football coach who currently is the head coach at Southeastern Louisiana University. Scelfo was the offensive coordinator for the UTSA Roadrunners football team of the University of Texas at San Antonio (UTSA) from 2016 to 2017. Scelfo has also served as the quarterbacks coach for the Jacksonville Jaguars of the National Football League (NFL).  He played college baseball at Northeast Louisiana.

Coaching career

High school
Scelfo started his coaching career coaching high school football in 1982. He coached mostly on offense, but did coach on defense a couple times. He coached in many different high schools in Louisiana and Texas.

College
Scelfo started coaching in college at Tulane University in 1996. He started out coaching tight ends before moving to quarterbacks and being an offensive coordinator. He coached four quarterbacks that played in the NFL. Those quarterbacks were Shaun King, Patrick Ramsey, J. P. Losman, and Lester Ricard.

Scelfo later coached at Louisiana Tech University, and the University of Arizona, where he coached Nick Foles and Matt Scott.

He was let go after two seasons at Arizona and he took a break from coaching in 2012.

Jacksonville Jaguars
Scelfo signed with the Jacksonville Jaguars following the 2012 NFL season, becoming the team's quarterbacks coach on January 23, 2013.

On January 28, 2015, it was reported Nathaniel Hackett would be the new quarterbacks coach for the Jacksonville Jaguars but Scelfo would remain on the staff. On February 5, 2015, it was reported Scelfo would be a senior offensive assistant.

Personal life
Scelfo is married to Holly Kingery and the couple has two sons, Anthony and Jordan. Anthony played quarterback and baseball at Tulane and was selected by the Tampa Bay Rays in the 2008 Major League Baseball draft, while Jordan played quarterback and baseball at the University of the Incarnate Word from 2012 to 2015. His brother, Chris Scelfo, serves as the offensive line coach for the Houston Cougars.

Head coaching record

References

External links
 Southeastern Louisiana profile

1959 births
Living people
Arizona Wildcats football coaches
Jacksonville Jaguars coaches
Louisiana Tech Bulldogs football coaches
Louisiana–Monroe Warhawks baseball players
Southeastern Louisiana Lions football coaches
Tulane Green Wave football coaches
UTSA Roadrunners football coaches
High school football coaches in Louisiana
High school football coaches in Texas
University of Louisiana at Monroe alumni
People from Abbeville, Louisiana